This is the list of events held and announced to be held in the Štark Arena.

Past events

Upcoming events

Notes

References

External links
 List of events held in Belgrade Arena at the official website
 List of events announced to be held in Belgrade Arena at the official website

Lists of events in Serbia
Buildings and structures in Belgrade
Events in Belgrade
Lists of events by venue